Robert Horner (1932–2008) was a Canadian politician.

Robert Horner may also refer to:
 Robert J. Horner (1894–1935), American film producer
 Bob Horner (born 1957), American baseball player
Robert Horner (cricketer) (born 1967), English cricketer